Slocum High School is a public high school located in unincorporated Slocum, Texas, United States and classified as a 2A school by the UIL. It has an Elkhart mailing address and is part of the Slocum Independent School District located in southeastern Anderson County. In 2013, the school was rated "Met Standard" by the Texas Education Agency.

Academics and debate 
Slocum High School participates in the following academic and debate competitions:

 UIL Academics
 CX Debate

State runner-up titles 

 CX Debate
 2019 (2A)

Athletics 
Slocum High School participates in the following sports 

Baseball
Basketball
Cross Country
Softball
Track and Field

State titles

Boys Basketball 
2009 (1A/D2)
 Girls Softball 
 2017 (1A)
 Girls Softball 
 2018 (1A)

References

External links
Slocum Independent School District

Schools in Anderson County, Texas
Public high schools in Texas
Public middle schools in Texas